David Thomas McLaughlin (March 16, 1932 – August 25, 2004) was the 14th President of Dartmouth College, 1981–1987. McLaughlin also served as chief executive officer of Orion Safety Products from 1988 to December 31, 2000. He was president and chief executive officer of the Aspen Institute from 1988 to 1997 and its chairman from 1987 to 1988. He served as chairman and chief executive officer of Toro Company from 1977 to 1981, after serving in various management positions at Toro Company since 1970. McLaughlin served as a director of CBS Corporation from 1979, becoming chairman of the board in January 1999 until the CBS merger. He also served as a director of Infininity Broadcasting Corporation until the Infinity merger.

Dartmouth presidency 

As an undergraduate McLaughlin was a member of Phi Beta Kappa and various student organizations such as Green Key, Palaeopitus, Beta Theta Pi fraternity, and Casque and Gauntlet. He earned his A.B. in 1954 and his M.B.A. in 1955, at the Tuck School of Business. He served Dartmouth steadily after graduation, joining the board of trustees in 1971 and becoming chairman in 1977. Like his predecessor Ernest Martin Hopkins, the fourteenth president in the Wheelock Succession came from a business background.

President McLaughlin succeeded in carrying out an ambitious agenda for Dartmouth, striving to keep it in the forefront of liberal education. During his tenure academic and athletic facilities were improved; the Rockefeller Center, Hood Museum, and boathouse were built; classrooms were renovated; the Dartmouth Skiway was improved; and the Berry Sports Center was built. Academic initiatives included the establishment of the John Sloan Dickey Center for International Understanding and the Institute for the Study of Applied and Professional Ethics. Faculty salaries increased 43 percent over a five-year period, the college's "need-blind" admissions policy was continued and the endowment grew to a new high of $521 million. Dartmouth's professional schools also grew under President McLaughlin's tenure: the Thayer School of Engineering received a $15 million grant to expand and improve facilities; the Tuck School of Business was strengthened; and Dartmouth Medical School was brought into financial equilibrium, greatly increasing its sponsored research and fund raising efforts.

Dartmouth continued to progress under McLaughlin's leadership and his continued commitment to liberal education and undergraduate teaching.

External links
 Dartmouth College
 Wheelock Succession
dartmouth.edu obituary

1932 births
2004 deaths
Presidents of Dartmouth College
Tuck School of Business alumni
American nonprofit chief executives
People from Grand Rapids, Michigan
20th-century American academics